Ron Stubbs (born 3 October 1948) is a former Australian rules footballer who played for Hawthorn in the VFL.

Stubbs spent a lot of time in the Hawthorn reserves and managed only 17 senior games during his four seasons. Six of them came early in the 1971 season, a premiership year for Hawthorn.

Ron was a much respected player for Carrum, who at that time played in the MPFL. He played for Carrum before his Hawthorn time and afterwards. He was a member of the 1973 and 1974 Premiership teams.  (In the image of the 1974 team, he is in the back row 7th from the left). Ron was the Best and Fairest in the MPFL in 1968 and 1975. He was also Best and Fairest at Carrum in 1967, 68, 73, 75, 79 and 81. 

He finished his career in Tasmania and played with Devonport in the North West Football Union. He represented the state at the 1980 Adelaide State of Origin Carnival and was selected in the All-Australian team.

References
Holmesby, Russell and Main, Jim (2007). The Encyclopedia of AFL Footballers. 7th ed. Melbourne: Bas Publishing.

External links

1948 births
Australian rules footballers from Victoria (Australia)
Hawthorn Football Club players
Devonport Football Club players
Tasmanian State of Origin players
All-Australians (1953–1988)
Living people